The Bourne Legacy may refer to:

 The Bourne Legacy (novel), a 2004 novel by Eric Van Lustbader
 The Bourne Legacy (film), a 2012 film starring Jeremy Renner